Acronicta valliscola is a moth of the family Noctuidae, originally discovered by André Blanchard in 1968. It is found only in Big Bend National Park in Texas.

Its wingspan is 30–35 mm.

References

valliscola
Moths of North America
Moths described in 1968